Michael McGlynn may refer to:

 Michael McGlynn (born 1964), Irish composer, director, and producer
 Michael J. McGlynn (born 1953), former mayor of Medford, Massachusetts
 Michael McGlynn (swimmer) (born 2000), South African marathon swimmer